Extreme Cougar Wives is a reality television special broadcast in the United States on TLC. It shows the romantic lives of a number of self-described "cougars"—older women who date younger men. The special aired on November 25, 2012.
It was aired only 3 episodes.
The special was viewed by 1.672 million viewers.

References

External links
 

Sexuality and age
TLC (TV network) original programming